Favelle Favco Berhad is a manufacturer of construction cranes under the brands Favelle Favco and Kroll. The company's main plant is based at Senawang, Malaysia, with production facilities and engineering offices also located in Sydney, China, Texas and Denmark.

The company's shares are traded on the Main Board of Bursa Malaysia, formerly known as the Kuala Lumpur Stock Exchange. It is partially owned by Muhibbah Engineering.

In 2012, its market capitalization was RM250 million, sales averaged RM490 million annually, and profits were RM29 million over the last five years. In 2013, annual revenue for the company was approximately RM764 million, with profits of just under RM65 million. In October 2014, its market capitalization was around RM700 million.

Company history
Muhibbah Engineering acquired Favelle Favco in 1995.

Products 
The company produces offshore cranes with lift capacities of up to 1,000 tonnes. In July 2013, RHB Research reported that 85% of Favelle Favco's 2013 year-to-date crane orders were offshore cranes.

Its cranes were used to construct some of the tallest skyscrapers ever built, including the World Trade Center in New York and its replacement, One World Trade Center, as well as the Burj Khalifa, Taipei 101, the Petronas Twin Towers, and the Shanghai World Financial Centre.

Favco has built the world's largest tower crane, nicknamed "Tinkerbell", which is capable of lifting up to 330 tonnes.

References

External links
 

Manufacturing companies of Malaysia
Malaysian brands
Companies listed on Bursa Malaysia
Crane manufacturers
Companies based in Selangor
Klang (city)